Ümitcan Güreş (born 24 June 1999) is a Turkish swimmer. He competed in the men's 50 metre butterfly event at the 2018 FINA World Swimming Championships (25 m), in Hangzhou, China.  He also competes for Harvard Crimson.

References

External links
 

1999 births
Living people
Sportspeople from Istanbul
Turkish male butterfly swimmers
Swimmers at the 2020 Summer Olympics
Olympic swimmers of Turkey
Harvard Crimson men's swimmers
Swimmers at the 2018 Mediterranean Games
Mediterranean Games medalists in swimming
Mediterranean Games bronze medalists for Turkey
Swimmers at the 2022 Mediterranean Games
21st-century Turkish people